The Best of Arthur C. Clarke: 1937-1971 is a collection of science fiction short stories by British writer Arthur C. Clarke originally published in 1973.

The stories, written between 1937 and 1971, originally appeared in a number of periodicals including Amateur Science Stories,  Zenith, The Fantast, Fantasy, Startling Stories, Astounding, Science Fiction Quarterly, 10 Story Fantasy, Infinity Science Fiction, The Magazine of Fantasy & Science Fiction, The Evening Standard, Vogue, Analog, If, Boys' Life and  Playboy

Contents
The contents include:
 1933: A Science Fiction Odyssey
 "Travel by Wire!"
 "Retreat from Earth"
 "The Awakening"
 "Whacky"
 "Castaway"
 "History Lesson"
 "Hide and Seek"
 "Second Dawn"
 "The Sentinel"
 "The Star"
 "Refugee"
 Venture to the Moon
 "The Starting Line"
 "Robin Hood, F.R.S."
 "Green Fingers"
 "All That Glitters"
 "Watch This Space"
 "A Question of Residence"
 "Into the Comet"
 "Summertime on Icarus"
 "Death and the Senator"
 "Hate"
 "Sunjammer"
 "A Meeting with Medusa"
 Bibliography

References
 
 

1973 short story collections
Short story collections by Arthur C. Clarke
Sidgwick & Jackson books